Steve Trash is an American magician. He was born in San Angelo, Texas.

Early life and education
Steve Trash was born in San Angelo Texas. The son of a forester and a teacher, Trash was raised in various places across Alabama, including Bay Minette, Montgomery and Florence.

Trash graduated from the University of North Alabama with a degree in theater. He then moved to New York City. Trash also attended Stella Adler Studio of Acting in New York City and Second City in Los Angeles, CA.

Career
Trash performs internationally at theaters, fairs and festivals. Trash created the world’s first eco-friendly green magic set which is a little magic kit that can be used by children or adults. The magic kit is made of renewable bamboo and rubber tree wood, making it environmentally friendly. Recently, in 2013, Steve Trash and Kelvin Holly released an album called The Trash Tunes. He has recently created The Recycle Cycle which is a mobile recycling edu-station. He created this to promote and help children to understand the importance of keeping our earth clean and litter free.

Steve Trash has entertained millions of kids around the world with his unique brand of eco-magic. Now, Steve brings his act to television in a series for children aged 6 – 10 that makes science fun! Science topics include ecosystems, food chains, soils and water cycles, weather and climate, the solar system, solar energy and more.

https://www.pbs.org/show/steve-trash-science/

https://www.pbs.org/show/steve-trash-science/
"In partnership with Alabama Public Television, Steve Trash produced a national science show for kids in June 2019.  Distributed by NETA (National Educational Telecommunications Association) to PBS stations across the US and is available on Apple TV, Roku, Chromecast, YouTube and the PBS app."
 Trash is a lifetime member of the Alabama Association for Environmental Education.
https://www.pbs.org/show/steve-trash-science/rash is also a founding board member of Keep the Shoals Beautiful.

Awards
Steve Trash was given the Environmental Educator of the Year Award by EEAA. His Trash and Recycle Show won the statewide Outstanding Project Award presented by RC&D in the year 2007. His video “Kids Making Better Choices” won the award in 2009 as well. His Green Magic Set won an American Specialty Retailers Association Award in 2009.

References

American magicians
Living people
Year of birth missing (living people)